The Arroyo Seco, meaning "dry stream" in Spanish, is a  seasonal river, canyon, watershed, and cultural area in Los Angeles County, California. The area was explored by Gaspar de Portolà who named the stream Arroyo Seco as this canyon had the least water of any he had seen. During this exploration he met the Chief Hahamog-na (Hahamonga) of the Tongva Indians.

Waterway course
The watershed begins at Red Box Saddle in the Angeles National Forest near Mount Wilson in the San Gabriel Mountains. As it enters the urbanized area of the watershed, the Arroyo Seco stream flows between La Cañada Flintridge on the west and Altadena on the east. Just below Devil's Gate Dam, the stream passes underneath the Foothill Freeway. At the north end of Brookside Golf Course the stream becomes channelized into a flood control channel and proceeds southward through the golf course.

The Arroyo Seco goes through Pasadena, where it passes the Rose Bowl Stadium as it goes through Brookside Park. This arroyo is one of two major streams that capture rainfall and storm water in Pasadena, the other being Eaton Wash on the eastern side of the city, which is a tributary of the Rio Hondo watershed.

 The Arroyo Seco then passes under the Ventura Freeway and the Colorado Street Bridge, and it crosses the Raymond Fault at the southern boundary of Pasadena at the San Rafael Hills. The channel continues along the western boundary of South Pasadena, then into northeast Los Angeles flowing southeast of the Verdugo Mountains and Mount Washington.

The Arroyo Seco then proceeds through the Los Angeles neighborhoods of Highland Park, Hermon, Montecito Heights, and Cypress Park. It ends at the confluence with the Los Angeles River near Elysian Park, north of Dodger Stadium and Downtown Los Angeles.

The Arroyo Seco Parkway, or Pasadena Freeway, runs parallel to the channelized Arroyo Seco from South Pasadena to the Los Angeles River.

History

Traditional narrative

Above Devil's Gate, the rapids of the Arroyo Seco are positioned so that the falls make a beating, laughing sound. In Tongva-Gabrieliño traditional narratives, this is attributed to a wager made between the river and the coyote spirit.

Early settlement
The Arroyo Seco was one of the Los Angeles River tributaries explored by Gaspar de Portola in the late summer and fall of 1770. He named the stream Arroyo Seco, for of all the canyons he had seen, this one had the least water. During this exploration he met the Chief Hahamog-na (Hahamonga) near Millard Canyon, at the settlement later known as Hahamongna - California. This band of the Tongva Indians would end up gathered into the fold of the San Gabriel Mission and with other bands and tribes collectively called "Gabrielenos."

The Arroyo Seco region can be considered by historical accounts as the birthplace of Pasadena. After the 1820s secularization of the Missions, the broad area to the east of the Arroyo was the Mexican land grant of Rancho San Pascual, present-day Pasadena, California. Manuel Garfias was the grantee of the Rancho and its longest early resident. His adobe house was on the east ridge of the Arroyo, in present-day South Pasadena.

With the 1874 establishment of the community of the Indiana Colony, the new residents built their homes along today's Orange Grove Boulevard, the major north–south avenue paralleling the Arroyo on the east. However, the deep and seasonally flooded Arroyo presented a barrier to easy travel and transportation between renamed Pasadena and Los Angeles. Stories of four and five hours just crossing the chasm, whether exaggerated or not, abounded in Pasadena history.

The first recorded American to live in the Upper Arroyo (north of Devil's Gate) was simply known as "Old Man Brunk". Brunk's cabin stood at a large bend in the canyon, roughly where the Forest Service housing is today. It was said he left San Francisco "for that town's good".

Transportation corridor
Dating back to the original Tongva residents of the area, the Arroyo Seco canyon has always served as a major transportation corridor.  Today it links downtown Los Angeles with Pasadena, the west San Gabriel Valley and the San Gabriel Mountains.

 By 1886 the Los Angeles and San Gabriel Valley Railroad  had been established from Downtown Los Angeles with a grand wooden trestle that cut a straight line crossing from the west side to the east. The wooden trestle was replaced with the Santa Fe Arroyo Seco Railroad Bridge. Eventually this line would hook up with rail lines built from the east to create the cross-country course of the Santa Fe Railroad. For local commutes, an electric traction trolley was put in and operated by the Pacific Electric Railway, a Henry E. Huntington enterprise, which ran the "Red Cars" from the upper Arroyo and Pasadena through the San Gabriel Valley into Los Angeles and many points beyond. The lower Arroyo Seco was served by the Los Angeles Railway "Yellow Car" lines.

 In 1900 Horace Dobbins, Mayor of Pasadena, opened his innovative California Cycleway, an elevated wood structure with a flat planked surface that would allow bicyclers to travel from Pasadena to Los Angeles avoiding the uncertain schedules of the early trains. Dobbins was only able to build a two-mile portion of the cycleway from the Green Hotel to Raymond Hill before competition from the railroads and the growing popularity of the horseless carriage undermined the project. Present day cycling activists are reviving a vision and plan for a dedicated bikeway from Pasadena to Los Angeles. The Arroyo Seco bicycle path now runs from Highland Park to South Pasadena; the Kenneth Newell Bikeway continues the route through Pasadena. 

In 1913 the Colorado Street Bridge was dedicated. This structure curves across the Arroyo accessing Eagle Rock, Glendale, and the San Fernando Valley. During the Stock Market Crash of 1929 and the subsequent Great Depression of the 1930s, the bridge was a jumping off point for many committing suicide, whereby it received the ignoble name of "Suicide bridge." By the 1980s the bridge fell into disrepair as chunks of concrete dropped from its face to the armory parking lot in the Arroyo below. After the San Francisco–Oakland Bay Bridge failure in the 1989 Loma Prieta earthquake, the Colorado Street Bridge was closed as a precautionary measure. Eventually assistance from the Federal Bridge Repair and Replacement Fund and other local governmental agency discretionary funds provided funding for the complete restoration and seismic retrofit of the bridge. The total project budget amounted to $24 million, and the Colorado Street Bridge was reopened on Dec. 13, 1993, on time and on budget.

Arroyo Seco Parkway

By mid-20th Century, the automobile had long become a mainstay of Southern California life. In 1940 the Arroyo Seco Parkway, the first freeway, was built as a parkway alongside the newly constructed flood channel in the Los Angeles portion of the Arroyo. Today, also known as the Pasadena Freeway, it continues on through downtown becoming the Harbor Freeway, and terminates near the harbor in San Pedro.

The Arroyo Seco Corridor Management Plan was completed for the "Arroyo Seco Parkway" in 2004.  The Plan was created through a partnership with the National Trust for Historic Preservation, the National Scenic Byways Center (Federal Highways), Caltrans (State Highways), the National Park Service, the Santa Monica Mountains Conservancy, and The Center for Preservation Education and Planning (CPEP Inc.).

The Arroyo Seco Flood Control Channel, was built by the Works Progress Administration before and during construction of the parkway to avoid damages from future floods.

Floods and controls
The Arroyo Seco generally has a flow of several cubic feet per second, but periodically it is inundated by torrential floods from its steep, erosion-prone mountain watershed. The reputation of Arroyo Seco floods led the Spanish to site the original Pueblo de Los Ángeles away from the confluence of the Arroyo Seco and the Los Angeles River. Historically, these floods would race down the stream bed and overflow through Pasadena, South Pasadena, Alhambra and Los Angeles communities all the way to the Los Angeles River. As Los Angeles developed into a city and grew outwards, the damage from these floods was particularly severe in 1914 and 1916.

Devil's Gate Dam
In 1920, the Los Angeles County Flood Control District built the first flood control dam in Los Angeles County at Devil's Gate gorge.  Named for a rock outcropping which resembles the face of a devil, this is the narrowest spot on the Arroyo Seco's course below Millard Canyon. The construction was by the Bent Brothers Company. Devil's Gate Dam in the Arroyo Seco in northern Pasadena between La Cañada Flintridge and Altadena is managed by the Los Angeles County Department of Public Works.

The flood basin above the dam captures the flows of the mountain watershed of the Arroyo Seco. This area is now called "Hahamongna", a phrase meaning "Flowing Waters, Fruitful Valley" in the language of the Tongva tribe who first inhabited the area. In 2011, the flood basin had filled with debris brought down after the 2009 Station Fire, reducing its effectiveness as a flood control measure. The County of Los Angeles conducted public hearings on the Environmental impact statement before selecting a method to remove debris from the Hahamongna area. In 2014, the Board of Supervisors approved a five-year project to remove 2.4 million cubic yards of sediment from the basin despite strong opposition from neighbors and recreational enthusiasts. The opponents contended that hundreds of trucks would be required that would increase pollution and noise. They also said that the wildlife habitat would be destroyed and interfere with hikers, cyclists and horseback riders who use the area for recreation. The alternative supported by Pasadena officials would have removed 1.4 million cubic yards of sediment and provided regular maintenance. County officials supported removing more sediment to reduce the flood risk for most major storms, the work having begun in early-2019.

Below Devil's Gate Dam, most of the Arroyo Seco creek, with two short exceptions, is contained in a concrete channel that contains stormwater and municipal runoff. This channel and other similar flood control structures throughout the Los Angeles Basin and along the foothills of the San Gabriel Mountains were built following the devastating Los Angeles Flood of 1938.

Restoration programs
For more than one hundred years, the natural environment of the Arroyo Seco and its proximity to a large urban population have inspired efforts to protect, manage and preserve it. L.A. County flood control was first founded in an effort to control the wild waters of the Arroyo Seco and Charles Lummis founded the Arroyo Seco Foundation in 1905 for the purpose of preserving recreational use and habitat, residents in Los Angeles and Pasadena contributed generously to efforts to buy up open space in the great canyon to protect for future generations.

There has been a series of studies conducted to assess and improve the management of the Arroyo Seco Watershed.  These include:

Restoration goals
 Restore full flood control functions in the Arroyo Seco area.
 Better manage, optimize, and conserve water resources while improving water quality.
 Improve regional park recreational opportunities and enhance nature reserve open space.

The restoration efforts are being carried out by the County of Los Angeles and local cities, primarily the City of Pasadena.

Jet Propulsion Laboratory - NASA
Early rocket-engine-testing began in the Arroyo Seco in 1936 and this led to the establishment of the Jet Propulsion Laboratory (JPL) at the mouth of the Arroyo Seco by the California Institute of Technology. During the 1950s, JPL was heavily involved in rocket testing, and the roar of rocket engines could be heard emanating from the Arroyo Seco area for miles. These rocket projects were terminated at the facility by 1958. By the mid-1960s, JPL had become instrumental in the development, launching, and tracking of a number of unmanned near-Earth and deep-space space probes for the National Aeronautics and Space Administration. One notable project was the Mars rover, which has returned a number of panoramic photos of the Martian surface.

JPL has been criticized by regional environmentalists and the community for its water pollution of the local groundwater with toxic chemicals, such as solvents and perchlorate rocket fuel accelerants. A monumental cleanup project by NASA has begun, which includes a multimillion-dollar pumping and water filtration system to treat the groundwater, removing toxins until the aquifer contamination level has been reduced below their federally-specified limits. This project is carried out by a NASA project team and monitored by the U.S. Environmental Protection Agency. Frequent public meetings are held with public comment, and recorded for the record on the quality and progress of the clean-up.

Trout Restoration

Before channelization, the Arroyo Seco was a spawning habitat for Southern Steelhead, the Anadromous form of rainbow trout. The Arroyo was home to a resident rainbow trout population until at least 2009, when mudslides following the Station Fire (2009) were thought to have wiped out the population. In November 2020, the California Department of Fish and Wildlife transplanted almost 500 trout from the West Fork San Gabriel River, definitively re-establishing the presence of native trout in the stream.

Crossings
From mouth to source (year built in parentheses):

Railroad
North Avenue 19 - twin bridges (1956)
North San Fernando Road (1913)
Interstate 5 - Golden State Freeway and ramps (1962)
West Avenue 26 (1939)
Southbound State Route 110 ramp to Interstate 5 (1962)
Interstate 5 ramp to northbound State Route 110 (1962)
Cypress Avenue [Pedestrian Bridge]
Railroad - Metro L Line
Pasadena Avenue (1940)
State Route 110 ramps to East Avenue 43 (1940)
East Avenue 43 (1939)
Sycamore Grove Park [Pedestrian Bridge]
South/East Avenue 52 (1940)
Via Marisol [originally Hermon Avenue] (1940)
[Pedestrian Bridge]
South Avenue 60 (1909)
State Route 110 ramps to South Avenue 60 (1940)
Railroad - Metro L Line
Marmion Way (1940) and California 110 Offramp (1940)
York Boulevard (1912)
State Route 110 - Pasadena Freeway (1939)
San Pasqual Avenue (1939)
Dirt road
South San Rafael Avenue (1922)
La Loma Road (1914)
South Arroyo Park dirt road
South Arroyo Park [Pedestrian Bridge]
Colorado Street Bridge carrying West Colorado Boulevard (1913)
State Route 134 - Ventura Freeway (1953)
North Arroyo Boulevard (1927)
West Holly Street (1925)
Seco Street (1939)
Rose Bowl Parking Lot [2 Pedestrian Bridges]
Brookside Golf Course [7 Pedestrian Bridges]
West Washington Boulevard (1939)
Brookside Golf Course [Pedestrian Bridge]
Interstate 210 - Foothill Freeway (1974)
Oak Grove Drive (1955)
Devil's Gate Dam
Explorer Road
Forest Route 2N70 (2002)

Attractions and landmarks

Upper Arroyo - mountains section 

The many the Arroyo Seco is one of the most popular hiking spots in Southern California. The mountainous part of the Arroyo Seco is located within the Angeles National Forest. Angeles Crest Highway skirts the western edge of the Arroyo Seco Canyon.

The following is a list of Forest Service facilities in the Upper Arroyo, from south to north:

Forest Service Employee Housing w/ attached public hitching rail and horse trough
Teddy's Outpost Picnic Area
Gould Mesa Campground
Niño Picnic Area
Paul Little Picnic Area
Oakwilde Campground
Commodore Perry Switzer Trail Camp
Switzer's Picnic Area
Red Box Station (at the canyon's head)
Switzer Falls
Dawn Mine
Bear Canyon
Millard Canyon -  Millard Canyon Falls

Millard Canyon, located near the mouth of the Arroyo, is a delightful canyon with an impressive waterfall.  Sunset Ridge The trail skirts the eastern side of the canyon, the eastern boundary of the Arroyo Seco Watershed.  Millard Canyon was a major pedestrian thoroughfare for Tongva, Serrano people, and other Californian Native Americans traveling between the Los Angeles Basin coastal plain, the San Gabriel Mountains, and the Mojave Desert regions of Southern California.

Brown Mountain Truck Trail, which begins near the confluence of El Prieto Canyon and proceeds across the front range of the San Gabriel Mountains to upper Millard Canyon, offers impressive vistas of the San Gabriel Valley.  The Burton Trail descends from this road to the upper stretches of the Arroyo near Oakwilde Campground.

The Gabrielino Trail, which is a popular journey for hikers, equestrians and bicyclists, travels up the steep canyon. A popular hike on the Gabrielino Trail is the 4 mile round trip to lower Switzer Falls from Switzer Picnic area.

Lower Arroyo - urban section
Jet Propulsion Laboratory NASA
Oak Grove Disc Golf Course
Hahamongna Watershed Park - (formerly "Oak Grove Park")
Devil's Gate Dam
Brookside Golf Course
Rose Bowl - stadium and flea market
Brookside Park
Kidspace Children's Museum
Colorado Street Bridge
Hotel Vista Del Arroyo - United States 9th District Court of Appeals
Lower Arroyo Park Archery Range
Pasadena Roving Archers
Pasadena Casting Club
Lower Arroyo Seco Historic District, including the Batchelder House - Arts and Crafts Movement
Arroyo Parkway
Metro L Line (Bridge crossing and Ave 57 Street Station)
Southwest Museum of the American Indian
"El Alisal"—Lummis House  - historic home museum and native plants gardens.
Heritage Square Museum - historic Victorian houses park.
Los Angeles River Center and Gardens Park
Confluence of the Arroyo Seco and Los Angeles River

See also
Artists of the Arroyo Seco (Los Angeles)
List of Los Angeles Historic-Cultural Monuments on the East and Northeast Sides
Los Angeles and San Gabriel Valley Railroad
Riparian zone
Floodplain restoration
Riparian-zone restoration
Urban runoff
Flood Control Act of 1941
Los Angeles flood of 1938

Gallery

References

External links

Arroyo Seco Foundation
City of Pasadena: Arroyo Seco website
Arroyo Seco Neighborhood Council — City of Los Angeles neighborhood council for communities/neighborhoods in the Arroyo Seco.
Angeles National Forest website

 
Canyons and gorges of California
Rivers of Los Angeles County, California
Tributaries of the Los Angeles River
Washes of California
Landforms of Los Angeles County, California
Los Angeles County, California regions
San Gabriel Mountains
San Gabriel Valley
San Rafael Hills
Geography of Los Angeles
Geography of Pasadena, California
Geography of the San Gabriel Valley
Angeles National Forest
Altadena, California
Cypress Park, Los Angeles
Highland Park, Los Angeles
La Cañada Flintridge, California
Montecito Heights, Los Angeles
Mount Washington, Los Angeles
Northeast Los Angeles
South Pasadena, California
History of Los Angeles
History of Los Angeles County, California
History of Pasadena, California
Works Progress Administration in California
Rivers of Southern California